SKELETONS: Museum of Osteology  was a museum attraction located in Orlando, Florida and Central Florida's largest natural history museum. Opened in May 2015, this was one of the two skeleton museums in the United States of America; the second being the Museum of Osteology. SKELETONS: Museum of Osteology featured over 500 real animal skeletons within 40 exhibits.

Gallery

References

Museums in Orlando, Florida
Natural history museums in Florida
Osteology
Museums established in 2015